Dmitry Petrov may refer to:
Dmitry Petrov (translator), a Russian translator and TV presenter
Dmitry Petrov (sprinter), a Russian sprinter
Dzmitry Pyatrow, a Belarusian footballer